Elaine Tettemer Marshall (born July 22, 1942) is an American billionaire heiress. Trusts for the benefit of Marshall and her sons own the 16% beneficial interest in Koch Industries; formerly owned by her husband, E. Pierce Marshall, to whom she was married from 1965 until his death in 2006. These shares were previously owned by her father in-law, J. Howard Marshall, who was married to actress Anna Nicole Smith in the last year of his life.

Elaine has been a member of the board of directors of Koch Industries since the 2006 death of her husband.

Legal issues 
After Anna Nicole Smith sued to lay a claim to the estate of J. Howard Marshall, Elaine's father in-law, Elaine was a party in several legal cases including Stern v. Marshall and Marshall v. Marshall.

As a trustee and a beneficiary of various family trusts, she was also a defendant in a case, decided in 2014, regarding gift tax due from an indirect gift of shares of Koch Industries by her father in-law to these trusts in 1995.

See also 
 List of female billionaires

References 

1942 births
Living people
American billionaires
Female billionaires
Koch Industries
Marshall family
People from Dallas